In 13 German states, the primary administrative subdivision higher than a Gemeinde (municipality) is the  or .

(Land-)Kreise stand at an intermediate level of administration between each state and the municipalities within it. These correspond to level-3 administrative units in the Nomenclature of Territorial Units for Statistics (NUTS 3).

Previously, the similar title Imperial Circle referred to groups of states in the Holy Roman Empire. The related term  was used for similar administrative divisions in some German territories until the 19th century.

Types of districts 

The majority of German districts are "rural districts", of which there are 294 . Cities with more than 100,000 inhabitants (and smaller towns in some states) do not usually belong to a district, but take on district responsibilities themselves, similar to the concept of independent cities. These are known as "urban districts" (German:  or )—cities which constitute a district in their own right—and there are 107 of them, bringing the total number of districts to 401. , approximately 26 million people live in these 107 urban districts.

In North Rhine-Westphalia, there are some cities with more than 100,000 inhabitants which are not urban districts, these being Recklinghausen, Gütersloh, Siegen, Paderborn, Bergisch Gladbach, Neuss and Moers. Nevertheless, these cities take over many district responsibilities themselves, although they are still part of a larger rural district. Midsize towns can perform particular administrative functions of the district as well, especially to provide common services to the local citizens. The classification as "midsize" town is usually based on a town's registered population, but varies from state to state.

A special type of rural districts includes the three  (Municipal unions of special kind), a fusion of a district-free town with its adjacent rural district: besides the Regionalverband Saarbrücken (Saarbrücken regional association), from 1974 until 2007 called "Stadtverband Saarbrücken" (Saarbrücken town association), there is the Hanover Region since 2001 and the Städteregion Aachen (Aachen region of towns) since 2009. Aachen, Hanover and Göttingen retain certain rights of an urban district (Kreisfreie Stadt); Saarbrücken has not explicitly determined a similar provision in its legislation.

Responsibilities 

According to common federal and state laws, the districts are responsible for the following tasks:

 The building and upkeep of "district roads"
 Other building plans which cover more than one local authority's area
 Caring for national parks
 Social welfare
 Youth welfare
 The building and upkeep of hospitals
 The building and upkeep of state schools of secondary education
 Household waste collection and disposal
 Car registration

Districts can perform additional functions, based on varying local laws in each region:

 Financial support for culture
 The building of pedestrian zones and bicycle lanes
 Financial support for school exchanges
 The building and upkeep of public libraries
 Revitalisation of the economy
 Encouraging tourism
 The management of state-run adult education colleges

All these tasks are carried out by local (municipal) authorities operating together. Urban districts have these responsibilities and also those of the municipalities.

District council 
The district council is the highest institution of a rural district and is responsible for all fundamental guidelines of regional self-administration. This council is elected directly every five years, except in Bavaria where it is elected every six years. Usually the administrative seat of a rural district is located in one of its largest towns. However, district council and administrative seat of some rural districts are not situated within the district proper, but in an adjacent district-free city. Most of those rural districts are named after this central city as well (e.g. Bamberg and Karlsruhe). Moers is the biggest city in Germany (and at present time the only one with more than 100,000 inhabitants) that is neither an urban district, nor the district seat of its rural district.

District administration 

In urban districts similar administrative functions are performed by a mayor, in most greater cities usually by the Lord Mayor.

Rural districts in some German states have an additional administrative committee called Kreisausschuss. This committee is generally led by the Landrat and includes a number of additional voluntary members. It takes over certain administrative functions for the district, following decisions of the district council. However, the exact role and regulations of this panel vary greatly between different states.

The city where the office of the district's administration is located is called Kreisstadt ("district city"), or Kreishauptort ("district main community") if it's not a city. Often the district is named after its district city.

Linguistically, any city within a district could be called a "Kreisstadt", especially those that aren't district-free to distinguish them from district-free cities. This term has to be distinguished from the legal term "Kreisstadt" that only denotes the location of the administrative office. In everyday language, district cities are also called Kreishauptstadt ("district capital").

See also 
 List of districts of Germany
 States of Germany
 List of rural districts with populations and area in km2 
 List of urban districts with populations and area in km2

Notes

References 

 
Subdivisions of Germany
Germany 3
Districts, Germany